Rago (also Rato) is an unincorporated community in Benton County, Arkansas, United States.

Notes

Unincorporated communities in Benton County, Arkansas
Unincorporated communities in Arkansas